Michael William Brown is an American chess grandmaster.

Chess career
Brown was introduced to chess in the second grade.

In May 2017, Brown achieved his first norm at the 26th Annual Chicago Open. He achieved his second norm later that year by defeating GM Zoltán Almási at the Chess.com-hosted Isle of Man International. He achieved his third and final norm in January 2019.

Personal life
In 2015, Brown began studying applied mathematics at Brigham Young University.

References

Living people
1997 births
American chess players
Chess grandmasters
Sportspeople from Irvine, California
Brigham Young University alumni